Doug Stephens (born April 17, 1964 in Vancouver, British Columbia) is a Canadian futurist, keynote speaker, author and business advisor on the future of retailing and consumerism.

Retail Prophet
Following a twenty-year career in retail, including the leadership of New York City’s iconic Janovic store chain, Stephens founded Retail Prophet, a consultancy specializing in the forecasting and articulation of future trends in retailing and consumer behavior.

The Retail Revival
In 2013 Stephens authored the book The Retail Revival: Reimagining Business For The New Age of Consumerism. The book presents the case that the unique social and economic conditions leading to unimaginable growth in the retail and consumer goods sectors through the latter part of the twentieth century are giving way to radically altered demographic, economic and technological realities, yielding a new, more demanding yet vastly more positive and sustainable retail landscape.

Reengineering Retail
In 2017 Stephens authored his second book "Reengineering Retail: The Future of Selling in a Post-Digital World". The book examines the rapid evolution of ecommerce and changing role of physical retail spaces in the future. The book also forecasts a new future economic model for the retail industry.

Resurrecting Retail
In 2021 Stephens authored his third book "Resurrecting Retail: The Future of Business in a Post-Pandemic World". The book explores the impact of the pandemic on the global retail industry and consumer behavior as well as documents historic changes in the competitive landscape brought on by the crisis and the new competitive challenges and opportunities it catalyzed.

Media
Stephens is a regular contributor on the CTV tech TV series App Central TV, co-hosted by Amber Mac and a business contributor for CBC Radio.  He has written feature articles for  Advertising Age and been quoted in Forbes, Profit Magazine, Canadian Business, The Globe and Mail, Toronto Star and a variety of other U.S. and Canadian media  He speaks internationally to both private and public sector organizations, and is represented as a speaker by The Lavin Agency.

References

Bibliography

External links 
Retailprophet

1964 births
Living people
Businesspeople from Vancouver
Canadian bloggers
Canadian company founders
Canadian television hosts
Writers from Vancouver